Robert Colgate House, also known as Stonehurst, is a historic home located in the Hudson Hill section of the Bronx in New York City.  It was built about 1860 and is a two-story picturesque Italianate villa built of ashlar Maine granite.  It features a low-pitched dormered roof with broad eaves surrounding a flat deck.  It was built for Robert Colgate (1812–1885), son of pioneer soap manufacturer William Colgate.

Colgate purchased the land in 1860 from Ann Cromwell; it had previously been owned by William G. Ackerman. The Riverdale Presbyterian Church was organized at a meeting held in Colgate's house in 1863.

It was listed on the National Register of Historic Places in 1983.

References

External links

"MINING ENGINEER BUYS PERKINS COUNTRY HOME; Stonehurst, With 10 Acres, Passes to Spruille Braden, Who Will Reside There," The New York Times, October 11, 1922.

Colgate family
History of the Bronx
Houses completed in 1860
Houses in the Bronx
Houses on the National Register of Historic Places in the Bronx
Italianate architecture in New York City
New York City Designated Landmarks in the Bronx
Riverdale, Bronx